This is a list of active and extinct volcanoes in Costa Rica.

See also
 List of lakes in Costa Rica
 Central America Volcanic Arc
 List of volcanoes in El Salvador
 List of volcanoes in Guatemala
 List of volcanoes in Honduras
 List of volcanoes in Nicaragua
 List of volcanoes in Panama

References

External links 

Vulcanología. Observatorio Vulcanológico y Sismológico de Costa Rica (OVSICORI).
Volcanes de Costa Rica I

Costa Rica
 
Volcanoes